Robert Hendrickson (17 September 1944 – 1 October 2016) was an American documentary filmmaker.

Manson
He was known as the co-director of the Oscar nominated documentary Manson about the "Manson Family" which he directed together with partner Laurence Merrick.

Career
He authored the book Death to Pigs and also directed the films Close Shave (1979) and Inside the Manson Gang (2007).

Death
His last public appearance was at the August 9, 2016 showing of his documentary at the New Beverly Cinema in Los Angeles. He died on October 1, 2016.

References

External links
 Official website
 

American documentary filmmakers
Place of birth missing
2016 deaths
1944 births